The desert wall gecko (Tarentola deserti) is a species of lizard in the family Phyllodactylidae.
It is found in Algeria, Morocco, Tunisia, and possibly Libya. Its natural habitats are subtropical or tropical dry shrubland, Mediterranean-type shrubby vegetation, freshwater spring, rocky areas, hot deserts, rural gardens, and urban areas.

Status & Threats
The desert wall gecko's population is not changing at the moment, and has a small population.
They don't have any current threats at the moment.

Conservation
The species may exist in some national parks, such as Dghoumes National park in Tunisia.

References

External links 

Tarentola
Reptiles described in 1891
Taxonomy articles created by Polbot